Rasbora semilineata is a species of cyprinid fish in the genus Rasbora from northern Borneo.

References

Rasboras
Fish described in 1916
Taxa named by Lieven Ferdinand de Beaufort
Taxa named by Max Carl Wilhelm Weber